Yahia Mufarrih (born September 18, 1968) is a Yemeni judoka. He competed internationally for Yemen at the 1992 Summer Olympics.

Career

Mufarrih competed in the middleweight division at the 1992 Summer Olympics in Barcelona, Spain. In the first round he was drawn against Nikola Filipov from Bulgaria, but he did not advance any further in the competition, as he lost the bout.

References

External links
 

1968 births
Living people
Yemeni male judoka
Olympic judoka of Yemen
Judoka at the 1992 Summer Olympics